Coast FM 95.3 is a commercial radio station broadcasting from Warrnambool, Victoria, Australia. It is currently owned by Ace Radio & broadcasts A Contemporary Hits Radio (CHR) format. It features both locally produced content & nationally syndicated content from both NOVA Entertainment & Grant Broadcasters.

References 

Radio stations in Victoria
Contemporary hit radio stations in Australia
Ace Radio
Warrnambool